Joe Martin Stage Race is a road cycling stage race held annually in Fayetteville, Arkansas. It is part of the UCI America Tour in category 2.2. It was created in 1978 under the name of Fayetteville Spring Classic. It was renamed the Joe Martin Stage Race in 1989 in honor of the race director Joe Martin, who died that year.

Men's race

Winners (since 1996)

Classification jerseys
 General classification leader
 Points classification leader
 Under 23 classification leader

Women's race

Race winners

Classification jerseys
 General classification leader
 Points classification leader
 Under 23 classification leader

References

Cycle races in the United States
Recurring sporting events established in 1978
1978 establishments in Arkansas
Sports competitions in Arkansas
UCI America Tour races